Doin' What I Gotta Do is the third album by Doug E. Fresh. It was released May 5, 1992, on Bust It Records, a sub-label of Capitol Records set up by MC Hammer, and was produced by Doug E. Fresh. Compared to his previous two albums, both of which are considered hip-hop classics, Doin’ What I Gotta Do was neither a critical nor a commercial success, peaking at only #47 on the Top R&B/Hip-Hop Albums. The single "Bustin Out (On Funk)" made it to #28 on the Hot R&B/Hip-Hop Singles & Tracks. It samples the 1979 Rick James single "Bustin’ Out."

Track listing
"D.O.A." – 1:07
"Bustin’ Out (On Funk)" – 4:01
"The Get Fresh Crew" – 4:50
"Back in the Dayz" – 4:48
"If I Was Your Man" – 4:34
"Come in from the Rain" – 5:28
"I Need My Woman Tonight" – 5:00
"Check It Out" – 3:43
"The History" – 2:47
"Imagine Me Just Pumpin' It Up" – 4:01
"You Make Me Wanna Shout" – 4:42
"The Money Grip" – 3:39
"There's Nothing Better" – 4:26
"I Love Myself" – 5:17
"No" – 4:49
"Vida Mia" – 2:26
"Peace to New York" – 3:54

Charts

References 

1992 albums
Doug E. Fresh albums
Capitol Records albums
New jack swing albums